Gortina is a village on the left bank of the Drava River in the Municipality of Muta in the historical Styria region in northern Slovenia.

There is a small church in the settlement with a wooden belfry. It is dedicated to Saint Stephen and was built in the early 18th century. It belongs to the Parish of Muta.

References

External links
Gortina on Geopedia

Populated places in the Municipality of Muta